The Texas Chainsaw Massacre 2 (also known as The Texas Chainsaw Massacre Part 2) is a 1986 American black comedy slasher film directed by Tobe Hooper. It is a sequel to The Texas Chain Saw Massacre, also directed and co-written by Hooper. The film was written by L. M. Kit Carson and produced by Carson, Yoram Globus, Menahem Golan and Hooper. Starring Dennis Hopper, Caroline Williams, Bill Johnson, Bill Moseley, and Jim Siedow, the plot follows a radio host victimized and captured by Leatherface and his cannibalistic family, while a former Texas Marshal hunts them down.

During its theatrical release, the film grossed $8 million domestically against its $4.5 million budget and became popular on home video. The sequel received a mixed reception from critics and audiences alike. Positives and negatives referred to its emphasis on black comedy and gore, which departed from the first film's approach that used minimal gore, low-budget vérité style and atmosphere to build tension and fear. Director Tobe Hooper decided to focus on its black comedy as this was present in the first film, but was unacknowledged by viewers because of its gritty content. Despite the mixed reception, the film eventually gained a cult following. It was followed by Leatherface: The Texas Chainsaw Massacre III in 1990.

Plot 
Two high school seniors, Buzz and Rick, race along a desolate stretch of Texas highway, en route to the Texas-OU football game at the Dallas Cotton Bowl and harass a pickup truck along the way. Heavily intoxicated, they use their car phone to call and harass on-air radio DJ Vanita "Stretch" Brock. Unable to convince them to hang up, Stretch is forced to keep the line open. As the two pass the same pickup truck, Leatherface emerges from the back of the truck and rips up the roof using his chainsaw. Rick tries shooting Leatherface with his revolver, but Leatherface kills Buzz. The car crashes, killing Rick.

The following morning, Lieutenant Boude "Lefty" Enright, former Texas Ranger, and uncle of Sally and Franklin Hardesty, who were victims of Leatherface and his family years earlier, arrives at the scene of the crime to help solve Buzz and Rick's murders. Lefty has spent the last thirteen years looking into his nephew's disappearance, investigating reports of mysterious chainsaw killings across Texas. He is contacted by Stretch, who brings him a copy of the audio tape that recorded the attack. He sends her away, leaving Stretch and L.G. to reluctantly get radio coverage of a Texas/Oklahoma Chili Cookoff. The winner happens to be Drayton Sawyer (current patriarch of the cannibalistic Sawyer family), who declares that his secret is having an eye for "prime meat."

Meanwhile, Lefty shops for an arsenal of chainsaws at a local hardware store. He at first unnerves, then amuses the shop's owner with his brutal testing of the saws on a log. Lefty then drives to Stretch's radio station and asks her to play the tape on her nightly radio show so that the public, which had previously mocked his case, will have to listen to him.

Drayton, driving home from his chili cookoff victory, demands that his family go to the radio station, prompted by the nightly radio broadcast of the tape. While preparing to leave for the night, Stretch is confronted by Bobby "Chop Top" Sawyer before being attacked by Leatherface. Her coworker L.G. Peters is apparently killed by Chop Top. Leatherface corners Stretch and is about to kill her, but she charms him into sparing her. Leatherface returns to Chop Top and leads him to believe that he has killed Stretch. They then take L.G. to their home, followed by Stretch, who becomes trapped inside the Sawyer home, an abandoned carnival ground decorated with human bones, multi-colored lights, and carnival remnants.

Lefty, who has been following their car all along, arrives equipped with chainsaws and proceeds to trash the home before he finds Franklin's remains. Meanwhile, Stretch is found by Leatherface, who puts L.G.'s skinned face and hat on her before tying her arms and leaving. Later, L.G. is still alive and frees Stretch before dying. Drayton finds Stretch and the family capture her. Chop Top scolds Leatherface when he finds out that Stretch is still alive. They torture her at the dinner table, but Lefty arrives and saves her. Stretch flees the ground, but Chop Top chases her. Lefty wounds Drayton. Lefty and Leatherface get into a chainsaw fight, and Leatherface is fatally wounded. The dying Drayton, accepting that he and his family have lost, takes a grenade from Nubbins' corpse and blows up the ground, killing himself, Lefty, Leatherface and Grandpa.

Chop Top chases Stretch to the top of a rock tower. Stretch grabs a chainsaw held by the corpse of the family's grandmother in a shrine and fatally wounds Chop Top, causing him to fall off the tower to his death. Stretch shouts in triumph and swings the chainsaw in the air.

Cast

 Dennis Hopper as Lt. Boude "Lefty" Enright
 Caroline Williams as Vanita "Stretch" Brock
 Jim Siedow as Cook
 Bill Moseley as Chop-Top
 Bill Johnson, close-up shots, Bob Elmore, every other shot except for close-up shots and bridge scene which is played by Tom Morga as Leatherface
 Ken Evert as Grandpa
 Harlan Jorand as Patrolman
 Detective as Kirk Sisco
 James N. Harrell as Cut-Rite Manager 
 Lou Perry as L.G. Peters
 Barry Kinyon as Mercedes Driver
 Chris Douridas as Gunner/Rick

Kinky Friedman appears in a cameo as Sports Anchorman, as does Dan Jenkins as T.V. Commentator and Joe Bob Briggs as Gonzo Moviegoer; Hooper also cameos.

Production 

Originally, Tobe Hooper was just going to produce the film but he could not find a director the film's budget would afford. According to the documentary Electric Boogaloo: The Wild, Untold Story of Cannon Films, the production company Cannon Films were expecting a horror film while Tobe Hooper wanted to make a black comedy. When Cannon viewed the film they were unhappy with the final product. The movie's climax was filmed at the closed Matterhorn amusement park in Prairie Dell, Texas. They shot in caves for the scenes inside the Sawyer home.

Gunnar Hansen was initially approached to reprise his role as Leatherface, but he claimed to have been offered "scale, plus ten percent" with the ten percent going to his agent. When he replied that he had no agent, they offered scale without the additional ten percent. Hansen found the offer too low. Unit publicist Scott Holton offered an alternate story claiming Hansen vacillated about the part and the offer was rescinded. Holton didn't believe the average viewer was even aware of who the original actors were, claiming "who are Neal, Hansen or Burns?"

Bill Moseley created a short film parody entitled The Texas Chainsaw Manicure, where he played a small role as the Hitchhiker and showed it to a screenwriter who was able to show it to Tobe Hooper. Hooper loved it and kept Moseley in mind for a part should he ever make a sequel. When the time came to cast Chainsaw 2, Moseley was contacted for the role of Chop Top, the Hitchhiker's twin brother.

Deleted scenes 
Several scenes were deleted by director Tobe Hooper due to pacing issues as mentioned on the 2000 Texas Chainsaw Massacre: The Shocking Truth documentary. One lengthy scene that was cut from the film involves the Sawyer Clan heading out at night to collect prime meat for their chili by slaughtering movie patrons and a group of rowdy, rioting fans. The deleted slaughtering scene featured several elaborate Tom Savini special effects. Another deleted scene also includes the American film critic Joe Bob Briggs.

Soundtrack 

 The Lords of the New Church: "Good to Be Bad" – 4:42
 The Cramps: "Goo Goo Muck" – 3:02
 Concrete Blonde: "Haunted Head" – 2:48
 Timbuk3: "Life Is Hard" – 4:06
 Torch Song: "White Night" – 3:42
 Stewart Copeland: "Strange Things Happen" – 2:58
 Concrete Blonde: "Over Your Shoulder" – 3:20
 Timbuk3: "Shame on You" – 4:48
 The Lords of the New Church: "Mind Warp" – 3:42
 Oingo Boingo: "No One Lives Forever" – 4:08

"Crazy Crazy Mama" by Roky Erickson was used in the film but not included on the soundtrack album.

Release

Theatrical release
The final poster design, featuring the family sitting together, was a parody of the poster for the 1985 teen comedy-drama film, The Breakfast Club. The film was released theatrically in the United States by Cannon Films on August 22, 1986, unrated due to the MPAA refusing to give it anything less than an "X" rating. It grossed $8,025,872 at the domestic box office.

Home media 
On September 1, 1998, the film was released on VHS by MGM Home Entertainment as part of the MGM Movie Time collection (which was available exclusively through Warner Home Video). On August 1, 2000, the film was released on a region 1 DVD by MGM Home Entertainment. On October 10, 2006, the film received a second DVD treatment from MGM, entitled "The Gruesome Edition", which featured an audio commentary by director Tobe Hooper and David Gregory, director of Texas Chain Saw Massacre: The Shocking Truth, as well as an audio commentary by actors Bill Moseley, Caroline Williams and special effects makeup creator Tom Savini. The special features also included deleted scenes, a feature-length documentary entitled It Runs in the Family, six still galleries and a trailer. A Blu-ray edition of the film was released on September 11, 2012 which featured all of the special features from the "Gruesome Edition" DVD.

Scream Factory released a Collectors Edition of the film on Blu-ray on April 19, 2016.

Reception

Critical response

Critical reception to the film was mixed. Roger Ebert awarded the film one star out of four, lambasting the film because it "goes flat-out from one end to the other, never spending any time on pacing, on timing, on the anticipation of horror. It doesn't even pause to establish the characters; Dennis Hopper has the most thankless task, playing a man who spends the first half of the movie looking distracted and vague, and the second half screaming during chainsaw duels." He also commented that it "has a lot of blood and disembowelment, to be sure, but it doesn't have the terror of the original, the desire to be taken seriously. It's a geek show." TV Guides review was similarly negative, stating that "the film feels as if Hooper himself has nothing but contempt for the original and went out of his way to tear it down." The New York Times criticized the film, saying, "Hooper's direction is a little sloppy," and that the film "is not first-grade chopped steak."

AllMovie's review was favorable, writing, "much-hated at the time of its release, Tobe Hooper's The Texas Chainsaw Massacre 2 has aged remarkably well, now playing as a strangely effective if none-too-subtle satire of several facets of '80s excess."

The Texas Chain Saw Massacre 2 holds a 50% approval rating on film review aggregator website Rotten Tomatoes, based on 32 reviews with an average rating of 5.1/10. Its consensus reads, "Without the tense atmosphere of its predecessor, the stakes feel lower, but The Texas Chainsaw Massacre 2 still shocks with a gonzo blend of over-the-top humor and gore." On Metacritic, the film holds a score of 42 out of 100 based on reviews from 13 critics, indicating "mixed or average reviews". It has since become a cult film.

Controversy 
In a similar way to its predecessor, The Texas Chainsaw Massacre 2 has had a checkered past in regard to its relationship with censors in various countries. As a result, the film was banned in Germany and Singapore, however the Freiwillige Selbstkontrolle der Filmwirtschaft in Germany later gave the uncut version an 18 rating, and Singapore gave it an R21 (Restricted to under 21) rating after an appeal. When the film was submitted in the United Kingdom to the BBFC for a certificate, the BBFC notified Cannon, the distributor, that at least 20 to 25 minutes of footage would have to be trimmed in order for the film to be given an 18 rating. Cannon attempted to cut the film, but eventually gave up after numerous re-edited versions failed to pass the BBFC. The uncut version of the film was eventually given an 18 rating in 2001. When released in Ontario, Canada the film had had 11 minutes cut after being rejected three times by Ontario censors.

The film was banned in Australia for 20 years. An uncut version was released on VHS by Warner Home Video in New Zealand in 1987, but could also be found (illegally, as the box proudly stated) in some Australian video stores at the time. The New Zealand VHS cassette has become very rare. In 2000, an unofficial VHS release was issued to retailers throughout Australia. This was done so illegally by a duplicating house, and without the knowledge of the OFLC. When news of the illegal copies leaked, a number of retailers were raided for possessing infringing copies. The duplicating house was similarly raided by Federal Customs. The film was finally passed for official release in Australia on November 30, 2006. The Uncut "Gruesome Edition" DVD was released on January 24 the next year.

Sequel

The official sequel to the film was Leatherface: The Texas Chainsaw Massacre III, though the events of this movie are retconned. In 1998, Tobe Hooper's son William Hooper, began work on All American Massacre, a short film that would be both a sequel and a prequel to The Texas Chainsaw Massacre 2. Hooper ran out of funds for post-production in 2000 and the film was never completed and released although the trailer leaked online in the early 2000s.

References

External links 

 

1986 films
1980s comedy horror films
1986 horror films
1980s serial killer films
1980s slasher films
American comedy horror films
Slasher comedy films
American sequel films
American serial killer films
1980s English-language films
American films about revenge
Films set in 1986
Films set in Texas
Films shot in Austin, Texas
The Texas Chainsaw Massacre (franchise) films
Golan-Globus films
Films directed by Tobe Hooper
1986 comedy films
American splatter films
Films produced by Menahem Golan
Films produced by Yoram Globus
1980s American films